Arctia khumbeli is a moth of the  family Erebidae. It was described by Otto Bang-Haas in 1927. It is found in the Tian Shan of China.

This species was formerly a member of the genus Acerbia, but was moved to Arctia along with the other species of the genera Acerbia, Pararctia, Parasemia, Platarctia, and Platyprepia.

External links

Moths described in 1927
Arctiina
Moths of Asia
Taxa named by Otto Bang-Haas